The 2016–17 Women's FIH Hockey World League Round 1 was held from April to October 2016.

Each continent hosted a regional pool, except Europe, which hosted two groups.

Singapore
Singapore, 9–17 April 2016.

Pool
All times are local (UTC+8).

Suva
Suva, Fiji, 28 June–2 July 2016. Matches were played in a Hockey5s format.

All times are local (UTC+12).

Pool

Prague
Prague, Czech Republic, 30 August–4 September 2016.

All times are local (UTC+2).

Pool

Accra
Accra, Ghana, 9–11 September 2016.

All times are local (UTC±0).

Pool

Douai
Douai, France, 13–18 September 2016.

All times are local (UTC+2).

Pool

Salamanca
Salamanca, Mexico, 27 September–2 October 2016.

All times are local (UTC−6).

Pool

Chiclayo
Chiclayo, Peru, 30 September–8 October 2016.

All times are local (UTC−6).

Pool

References

External links
Official website (Singapore)
Official website (Suva)
Official website (Prague)
Official website (Douai)
Official website (Accra)
Official website (Salamanca)
Official website (Chiclayo)

Round 1
2016 in women's field hockey